Vivekanandan (Tamil: விவேகானந்தன் and Malayalam: വിവേകാനന്ദൻ) is an Indian name that is mostly used in South India (mainly, Kerala and Tamil Nadu) as a variant of the name Vivekananda. 
The name originates from two Sanskrit-based words Vivekam meaning wisdom or knowledge and Anandam meaning joy; therefore, the name Vivekanandan denotes a person who finds joy in wisdom or knowledge.

People 
 Swami Vivekananda, Indian Hindu monk of the 19th century who introduced the Indian philosophies of Vedanta and Yoga to the Western world
 Vivek (actor), South Indian film actor and comedian of the Tamil film industry
 V. K. Sasikala, South Indian politician and business person

Other uses 
 Vivekanandan version, a modern version of Akilam, the main religious text of the Tamil belief system Ayyavazhi